The Fort Stanton–Snowy River Cave National Conservation Area is a National Conservation Area in the eastern foothills of the Sierra Blanca, between Capitan and Lincoln in south central New Mexico. It was established in 2009 to protect, conserve, and enhance the unique and nationally important historic, cultural, scientific, archaeological, natural, and educational cave resources of the Fort Stanton–Snowy River cave system.

The National Conservation Area was once known as the Fort Stanton Military Reservation. In 1855, the U.S. Cavalry established Fort Stanton as a cavalry fort. During these tumultuous times, the 9th and 10th Cavalry and the 24th and 25th Infantry Buffalo Soldiers were sent to the New Mexico Territory to protect settlers in the area. The historic fort and its buildings are managed by the New Mexico State Parks Division. The lands surrounding the fort are managed by the Bureau of Land Management. Within the National Conservation Area is Fort Stanton Cave, the third longest cave in New Mexico. This cave was explored by soldiers posted at the fort as evidenced by their inscriptions within the cave. Snowy River Cave is a famous cave passage within Fort Stanton Cave, named for its beautiful stream bed of bright white calcite.

References
Fort Stanton–Snowy River Cave National Conservation Area profile

National Conservation Areas of the United States
Bureau of Land Management areas in New Mexico
Nature reserves in New Mexico
Protected areas established in 2009
Protected areas of Lincoln County, New Mexico
Units of the National Landscape Conservation System
2009 establishments in New Mexico